Satya Baharom (10 August 1937 – 26 February 2005), known professionally as Saadiah was a Malaysian actress and director, who famous in the 1950s and 1960s during the golden era of the Malay films.

Biography 
Saadiah became interested in movies after taking her sister Mariam Baharum (Mariam Tahi Lalat) to the Studio Jalan Ampas to accompany her sister. One day, director B S Rajhans offered her the opportunity to lead a minor character in Rachun Dunia's film, starring Osman Gumanti, Kasma Booty, and P Ramlee.

Saadiah participated in movies with P. Ramlee are Juwita, Anjoran Nasib, Sedarah, Penarek Becha, Hang Tuah, Semerah Padi, Sarjan Hassan, Musang Berjanggut and Antara Dua Darjat amongst others.

With the “Ceritaku Ceritamu” movie, Saadiah became the first Malay female director. However, it was her one and only directorial movies.

Her last movie was Matinya Seorang Patriot directed by Datuk Rahim Razali in 1984 with Eman Manan, Noor Kumalasari, Yusof Wahab and Zulkifli Zain.

Personal life 
Her health condition did not allow her to continue acting. She was married to Datuk Ahmad Daud and was a mother to Fauziah (also known as Ogy), Fazlina, and Faizal.

She died on February 26, 2005, at 68, diagnosed with diabetes.

Filmography 
In 1975, Saadiah acted with her husband and daughter Fauziah Ahmad Daud in the movie Permintaan Terakhir.

References

External links 
 

1937 births
2005 deaths
Place of birth missing
Deaths from diabetes
20th-century Singaporean actresses
21st-century Singaporean actresses
Singaporean women film directors
Singaporean film directors
Singaporean film actresses